"Any Time at All" is a song by the English rock band the Beatles. Credited to the Lennon–McCartney partnership, it was mainly composed by John Lennon, with an instrumental middle eight by Paul McCartney. It first appeared on the Beatles' A Hard Day's Night album.

Origin
In his 1980 interview with Playboy, Lennon described the song as "An effort at writing 'It Won't Be Long'. Same ilk: C to A minor, C to A minor—with me shouting."

Lyrically, the song appears similar to the 1963, song, "All I've Got to Do" off the album, With the Beatles.

Lennon's handwritten lyrics for "Any Time at All" were sold for £6,000 to an unidentified individual at an auction held at Sotheby's in London, on 8 April 1988.

Recording
Incomplete when first brought into EMI Studios on Tuesday 2 June 1964, Paul McCartney suggested an idea for the middle eight section based solely on chords, which was recorded with the intention of adding lyrics later. But by the time it was needed to be mixed, the middle eight was still without words and that is how it appears on the LP. McCartney sings the second "Any time at all" in each chorus because Lennon couldn't reach the notes.  "Any Time at All" reprises a George Martin trick from "A Hard Day's Night" by using a piano solo echoed lightly note-for-note on guitar by George Harrison.

Releases
In addition to A Hard Day's Night, "Any Time at All" was included on:
 Extracts from the Album A Hard Day's Night British EP.
 Capitol album Something New
 Rock 'n' Roll Music compilation LP.

Personnel
John Lennon – lead vocal, acoustic rhythm guitar, electric guitar (concluding chord)
Paul McCartney – backing vocal, bass, piano
George Harrison – 12-string lead guitar, classical guitar
Ringo Starr – drums, cowbell
Personnel per Ian MacDonald except where noted

References
Citations

Sources

Further reading
 

The Beatles songs
1964 songs
Song recordings produced by George Martin
Songs written by Lennon–McCartney
Songs published by Northern Songs